Extrapreneur is an entrepreneurial dynamic based on collaborative and systemic economy, consisting of alliances between various private companies, public authorities and citizens, in order to create new activities solving joint issues.

See also 
 Ikigai 
 Entrepreneurship 
 Intrapreneurship 
 Fablab

Bibliography 

 Le nouveau jeu économique - Expérimentez des solutions systémiques pour entrer dans la nouvelle économie de Michel De Kemmeter et Paul Mauhin, 2014
 The rise of the extrapreneur: making cross-sector collaboration happen, The guardian
 Extrapreneurs: A More Sensible Form of Entrepreneurship? , The European Business Review, 2017
 Extrapreneurship Is The Future Of Entrepreneurship, Huffingtonpost uk

Entrepreneurship